is a district located in Ehime Prefecture, Japan.

As of 2007, the district has an estimated population of 12,304 with a total area of 94.34 km2.

The district consists of one town.
Ikata

History 
In accordance with 1878 Land Reforms, the district was founded after breaking off from the Uwa District.  (1 town, 22 villages)
February 1898 — The village of Hirano was reassigned to the Kita District (now the city of Ōzu).  (1 town, 21 villages)
August 1, 1914 — The village of Kawanoishi gained town status.  (2 towns, 20 villages)
September 3, 1921 — The village of Mikame gained town status.  (3 towns, 19 villages)
July 1, 1928 — The village of Kamiyama gained town status.  (4 towns, 18 villages)
January 1, 1930 — The village of Yanozaki merged into the town of Yawatahama.  (4 towns, 17 villages)
February 11, 1935 — The villages of Senjō, Shitada, and the town of Kamiyama merged into city of Yawatahama.  (2 towns, 15 villages)
January 1, 1955 — The villages of Nikifu, Mishima, Izumi and parts of Fukigawa in the village of Futaiwa merged into the town of Mikame.  (2 towns, 13 villages)
February 1, 1955 — The villages of Futaiwa (excluding parts), Hizuchi, Maana and Kawakami merged into the city of Yawatahama.  (2 towns, 9 villages)
March 31, 1955
The villages of Isotsu, Miyauchi, Kawanoishi, and Kisuki merged to become the town of Honai.  (2 towns, 6 villages)
The villages of Ikata and Machimi merged to become the town of Ikata.  (3 towns, 4 villages)
The villages of Kanmatsu and Misaki merged to become the town of Misaki.  (4 towns, 2 villages)
June 1, 1956 — The villages of Mitsukue and Yotsuhama merged to become the town of Seto.  (5 towns)
April 1, 2004 — The town of Mikame merged with the towns of Uwa, Nomura, Akehama, and Shirokawa from Higashiuwa District to form the city of Seiyo.  (4 towns)
March 28, 2005 — The town of Honai merged into the city of Yawatahama.  (3 towns)
April 1, 2005 — The towns of Seto, and Misaki merged into the town of Ikata.  (1 town)

External links
Town of Ikata

Nishiuwa District